Greater Anglia may refer to:

Greater Anglia (train operating company) – train operating company running services in the East of England
East Anglia franchise – train franchise in England formerly known as the Greater Anglia franchise